Nowe Byliny  is a village in the administrative district of Gmina Żelechlinek, within Tomaszów Mazowiecki County, Łódź Voivodeship, in central Poland.

References

Nowe Byliny